Chitalwana is a Tehsil of  Jalore district of Rajasthan, India. It is about 30 km from it. The town is frequently flooded by River Luni and the overflowing of Narmada canals. The area is severely lacking in basic infrastructure, healthcare facilities and basic amenities with low literacy rate and high amount of interstate migration to adjacent states of Gujarat and Maharashtra.

References

Villages in Jalore district